Evert Linthorst (born 3 March 2000) is a Dutch professional footballer who plays as a midfielder for Go Ahead Eagles.

Club career
He made his Eredivisie debut against AFC Ajax on 19 April 2018.

On 1 February 2021, Linthorst signed with Al Ittihad Kalba.

On 30 January 2022, Linthorst signed a contract with Go Ahead Eagles until the summer of 2024.

References

External links
 

2000 births
Footballers from Venlo
Living people
Dutch footballers
Association football midfielders
VVV-Venlo players
Al-Ittihad Kalba SC players
Go Ahead Eagles players
Eredivisie players
UAE Pro League players
Dutch expatriate footballers
Expatriate footballers in the United Arab Emirates
Dutch expatriate sportspeople in the United Arab Emirates